Almus is a town and a district of Tokat Province in the Black Sea region of Turkey. The mayor is Hasan Hüseyin Arıkan (AKP).

See also
Almus Dam

References

Populated places in Tokat Province
Districts of Tokat Province